Hoes Heights is an area of North Baltimore, Maryland in zip code 21211, between West Cold Spring Lane and West 41st Street (north-south) and Evans Chapel Road and Falls Road (east-west).

The neighborhood bears the name of Grandison Hoe, a freed slave in Antebellum Baltimore who once owned and operated a farm there.

See also
 List of Baltimore neighborhoods

References

Neighborhoods in Baltimore
Northern Baltimore